The List of Alberta provincial ministers shows the succeeded, and current members of the Executive Council of Alberta of the Alberta Legislature.

Premier

Deputy Premier

Minister of Indigenous Relations

Associate Ministers in the Aboriginal Affairs portfolio

Minister of Advanced Education

Minister of Agriculture

Associate ministers in the Agriculture portfolio

Minister of Career Development and Employment

Minister of Children and Youth Services

Minister of Community Development

Minister of Community and Occupational Health

Minister of Consumer and Corporate Affairs

Minister of Culture

The current ministry was created in 2019 and has lost and gained several titles and portfolios since then, but is based on agencies from other cultural ministries dating back to 1971, and reorganized in 1992.

Minister of Economic Development

Associate Ministers in the Economic Development portfolio

Minister of Education

Minister of Energy

Associate ministers within the Resource Development portfolio

Minister of the Environment

Minister of Family and Social Services

Associate ministers in the Family and Social Services portfolio

Minister of Finance

Minister of Forestry, Lands and Wildlife

Associate Ministers in the Forestry, Lands and Wildlife portfolio

Minister of Gaming

Minister of Health

Associate Ministers in the Health Portfolio

Minister of Housing

Associate Ministers in the Housing and Urban Affairs Portfolio

Minister of Industry and Commerce

Minister of Infrastructure

Associate Ministers in the Infrastructure portfolio

Minister of Innovation and Science

Minister of International and Intergovernmental Relations

Associate Minister of International and Intergovernmental Relations

Minister of International Trade

Minister of Justice and Attorney General
The portfolio of the Minister of Justice was held by the Attorney General from 1905 to 1992.

Minister of Labour

Minister of Mines and Minerals

Minister of Municipal Affairs

Provincial Secretary

Minister of Public Welfare

Minister of Recreation and Parks

Minister of Restructuring and Government Efficiency

Minister of Revenue

Minister of Seniors

Associate Ministers in the Seniors Portfolio

Minister of Service Alberta

Minister of Social Development

Solicitor General

Minister of Special Projects

Minister of Sustainable Resource Development

Minister of Telephones

Associate Ministers in the Telephone Portfolio

Minister of Tourism

Associate Ministers in the Tourism portfolio

Minister of Trade 

The modern ministry of Minister of Trade, Immigration and Multiculturalism was created in 2022.  For previous ministries with similar titles see "economic development" and "international trade".

Treasury Board President

With the exception of a brief period from 1934 until 1935, this function has been fulfilled by the provincial treasurer for the province's entire pre-2004 history.

Minister of Transportation

Associate Ministers in the Transportation Portfolio

Minister of Utilities

Minister without Portfolio

Note list

References 

Other references
December 13, 2013 - cabinet swearing in ceremony
May 19, 1970 appointments to Cabinet, Alberta Gazette
May 27, 1969 appointments to Cabinet, Alberta Gazette
May 20, 1969 appointments to Cabinet, Alberta Gazette
July 16, 1968 appointments to Cabinet, Alberta Gazette
June 29, 1967 appointments to Cabinet, Alberta Gazette
July 31, 1964 appointments to Cabinet, Alberta Gazette
July 29, 1964 appointments to Cabinet, Alberta Gazette
November 30, 1962 appointments to Cabinet, Alberta Gazette
October 15, 1962 appointments to Cabinet, Alberta Gazette
August 2, 1955 appointments to Cabinet, Alberta Gazette
December 23, 1954 appointments to Cabinet, Alberta Gazette
January 5, 1954 appointments to Cabinet, Alberta Gazette
November 10, 1953 appointments to Cabinet, Alberta Gazette
September 16, 1952 appointments to Cabinet, Alberta Gazette
September 9, 1952 appointments to Cabinet, Alberta Gazette
May 1, 1951 appointments to Cabinet, Alberta Gazette
April 20, 1945 appointments to Cabinet, Alberta Gazette
September 12, 1944 appointments to Cabinet, Alberta Gazette
March 30, 1944 appointments to Cabinet, Alberta Gazette
June 1, 1943 appointments to Cabinet, Alberta Gazette
May 31, 1943 appointments to Cabinet, Alberta Gazette
January 20, 1937 appointments to Cabinet, Alberta Gazette
September 3, 1935 appointments to Cabinet, Alberta Gazette
August 10, 1934 appointments to Cabinet, Alberta Gazette
July 14, 1934 appointments to Cabinet, Alberta Gazette
July 10, 1934 appointments to Cabinet, Alberta Gazette
June 15, 1934 appointments to Cabinet, Alberta Gazette
October 1, 1930 appointments to Cabinet, Alberta Gazette
December 31, 1926 appointments to Cabinet, Alberta Gazette
June 5, 1926 appointments to Cabinet, Alberta Gazette
November 23, 1925 appointments to Cabinet, Alberta Gazette
August 31, 1921 appointments to Cabinet, Alberta Gazette
April 29, 1920 appointments to Cabinet, Alberta Gazette
September 25, 1918 appointments to Cabinet, Alberta Gazette
August 26, 1918 appointments to Cabinet, Alberta Gazette
August 23, 1918 appointments to Cabinet, Alberta Gazette
October 16, 1917 appointments to Cabinet, Alberta Gazette
November 28, 1913 appointments to Cabinet, Alberta Gazette
March 26, 1913 appointments to Cabinet, Alberta Gazette
May 4, 1912 appointments to Cabinet, Alberta Gazette
June 1, 1910 appointments to Cabinet, Alberta Gazette
May 26, 1910 appointments to Cabinet, Alberta Gazette
September 9, 1905 appointments to Cabinet, Alberta Gazette

Further reading 
 

Min